Quambatook (subtitled The Australian Folk Musical) is a Musical theatre piece written by Australian Simon Heath and John Williamson. It was directed by Bernie Zelvis. The musical is based on the early days of the Williamson family in Quambatook, Victoria, Australia and their quest to see Uluru. Williamson announced the musical in September 2007 Drew Anthony was the choreographer.

It had its world premiere at the Evan Theatre, in Penrith, NSW on 7 February 2008 and received positive audience reaction.  The show had a limited 4-show run, ending on 10 February 2008.

Plot
Quambatook is set in 1955 and tells the story of 11-year-old Johnno who live in the small Victorian farming town of Quambatook. For years, he and his family have happily sat around the radio, listened, sang and played along with songs from "The Silver Haired Showman's" weekly radio show. But ever since Johnno heard the Showman describe his experiences in the Northern Territory at Uluru, he has had only one desire; to see and experience the big red rock for himself. Whether or not they make it to Uluru isn't important, Johnno's Mum tells him in the musical, the fact is "The Joy is in the Journey".

Cast
 John Williamson - narrator
 Darren Coggan
 Belinda Wollaston
 Ami Williamson - Sheila
 Shardyn Fahey-Leigh - Wil
 Benson Anthony

Concept album

A cast recording album was released in Australia in February 2008.

Track listing
 "Sing You the Outback"
 "Bush Town"
 "My Little Ukulele"
 "Big Brother, Little Brother"
 "The Farming Game"
 "Big Bad Bushranger"
 "Aussie Balladeer"
 "My Dad Snores"
 "Big Bad Banksia Man"
 "Christmas Photo" 
 "Ancient Mountains"
 "Christmas Waltz"
 "This Is Australia Calling"
 "Coolibah Blue"
 "Songs for My Guitar"
 "Headin' for the Rock (aka Alice Springs)"
 "The Joy Is in the Journey"
 "Papa Whisky November"
 "A Thousand Feet"
 "Raining on the Rock"
 "Old Man Emu"

References

2008 albums
John Williamson (singer) albums
Cast recordings
2008 musicals
Australian musicals
Original musicals